Dante Park is a public park in Manhattan, New York City, located in the Upper West Side neighborhood in front of Lincoln Center near Central Park.

Dante Park was established in 1921 by Italian-Americans in honor of the Italian poet Dante Alighieri (1265–1321) on a triangular plot of land opposite Lincoln Center, bounded by Broadway, Columbus Avenue, and West 64th Street. Carlo Barsotti, the editor of the Italian-American newspaper Il Progresso Italo-Americano, originally wanted to erect a much more substantial statue of Dante to be placed in Times Square around 1912, but because of fundraising difficulties opted for a smaller statue completed by Ettore Ximenes to be erected at Broadway and West 64th Street in 1921, the 600th anniversary of Dante's death.  Dante Park underwent renovations in the early 1990s funded by the neighboring Radisson Empire Hotel, with the sculpture also repaired.

A Dante Alighieri statue of the same casting as Dante Park is featured at Meridian Hill Park in Washington, D.C.

See also
List of New York City parks

References
 Bill Morgan. Literary Landmarks of New York (Universe: New York, 2002), p. 128.

External links

 Dante Park Description at the NYC Department of Parks and Recreation

Parks in Manhattan
Pocket parks
Lincoln Square, Manhattan
Dante Alighieri